Natela Nicoli-Metzger (born 19 April 1961 in Tbilisi) is a Georgian opera singer. She sings in Georgian, Russian, German, Italian, French, English, and Spanish among other languages.

Notes
Natela Nicoli is a daughter of Lamara Chkonia.

Natela Nicoli ist Präsidentin und Künstlerische Leiterin der Accademia Belcanto Festivals.(Austria): www.accademia-belcanto.com
www.natela-nicoli.com

External links
Natela Nicoli, Mezzosoprano
Süddeutsche Zeitung
Paata Burchuladze – 25 Years on the World Stage
Natela in Carmen
Opera Today
Mezzosoprano page
Fabio Luisi official website

1961 births
Living people
20th-century women opera singers from Georgia (country)
Operatic mezzo-sopranos
Musicians from Tbilisi
People's Artists of Georgia
21st-century women opera singers from Georgia (country)